A Corny Concerto is a 1943 Warner Bros. Merrie Melodies directed by Bob Clampett. The short was released on September 25, 1943, and stars Bugs Bunny, Porky Pig, Elmer Fudd and Daffy Duck.

They perform a parody of Walt Disney's Silly Symphony cartoon series and specifically his 1940 feature Fantasia. The film uses two of Johann Strauss' best known waltzes, "Tales from the Vienna Woods" and "The Blue Danube".

Plot
Pyotr Tchaikovsky's Piano Concerto No. 1 is heard over the opening credits, featuring Carnegie Hall parody "Corny-gie Hall". Afterwards, a musicologist, played by Elmer Fudd appears in an ill-fitting tailcoat, unshaven and in glasses, parodying Deems Taylor in Fantasia.

The first of the two musical segments is set to Strauss' waltz Tales from the Vienna Woods. Porky Pig plays Elmer Fudd's usual role of hunter, accompanied by his hunting dog. Porky  explains what he is doing via a sign reading, "I'm hunting that @!!*@ rabbit!!", which turns out to be Bugs Bunny. A series of visual gags ensue, culminating with all three characters believing that they have been shot. After Porky and the dog realize that they are unharmed, they attempt to give first aid to the apparently fatally wounded Bugs, as the dog bawls in tune with the music. When Porky finally pries Bugs' clenched hands off the supposed gunshot wound in his chest, Bugs is revealed to have a baby blue bra underneath. Emitting a scream of modesty, Bugs caps the bra over the bewildered hunters' heads and then, wearing a tutu and pointe shoes, gracefully dances off into the distance, falling over at the music's climax.

Fudd returns briefly to introduce the second segment, Strauss' The Blue Danube waltz. Young Daffy Duck attempts to join the three cygnets (baby swans) who follow their mother swan, all paddling around in waltz time; the mother consistently violently rebuffs the "ugly duckling" because he looks and sounds so different from her own brood. Meanwhile, a large buzzard with a "hep cat" hairdo spots the troupe and goes "Out To Brunch" by swooping down and sprinkling salt and pepper on the cygnets. He plucks each out of the water (the last youngster is revealed to be fitted with a tiny outboard motor), then grabs Daffy, but immediately puts him back with a sign reading "Rejected 4F" (unfit for military service). Upon realizing her children are gone, the mother swan faints and Daffy becomes shocked. Upon seeing the Buzzard making off with the cygnets, Daffy gets angry, takes on the aspect of a Curtiss P-40 fighter aircraft and buzzes the Buzzard, who literally turns yellow, drops the cygnets (who parachute back to the water) and flees. Daffy stuns the Buzzard then hands him a drum of TNT which blows him sky high. The buzzard is last seen gliding towards heaven (via an attached balloon) in angel garb, strumming  a harp. The cartoon ends with the swan family and Daffy merrily quacking the Blue Danube as they glide across the water together. They wave goodbye to the audience as the cartoon ends.

Reception
Fantasia was marketed to highbrow music fans; the Looney Tunes staff responded by violating the ivory tower of classical music and concert hall culture. A Corny Concerto parodies Fantasia'''s Silly Symphonies-derived balletic approach to storytelling. Elmer Fudd stands in for Deems Taylor and in an anti-highbrow gag, his starched shirtfront keeps erupting from his shirt to hit him on the face.

In 1994, A Corny Concerto was voted No. 47 of the 50 Greatest Cartoons of all time by members of the animation field.

Home media
The short is available on disc 4 of the Looney Tunes Golden Collection: Volume 2 DVD set and also appears in the documentary Bugs Bunny: Superstar. It can also be found on The Golden Age of Looney Tunes Vol. 1 laserdisc, the Looney Tunes Collectors Edition: Musical Masterpieces VHS, and Looney Tunes Spotlight Collection: Volume 2.

Since most of this cartoon has fallen into public domain (with the exception of the brief quotation of “The Music Goes Round and Round”), it has made frequent appearances on many gray-market VHS and DVD cartoon releases.

See alsoPigs in a Polka'': a 1943 cartoon slapstick to the works of Johannes Brahms
Looney Tunes and Merrie Melodies filmography (1940–1949)
List of Bugs Bunny cartoons
List of Daffy Duck cartoons
List of films in the public domain in the United States

References

External links

 
 

1943 films
1943 animated films
1943 short films
1940s American animated films
1940s animated short films
1940s musical fantasy films
1943 musical comedy films
1940s parody films
American musical comedy films
American musical fantasy films
1940s English-language films
Animated anthology films
Merrie Melodies short films
Films about hunters
Bugs Bunny films
Daffy Duck films
Porky Pig films
Films set in Austria
Disney parodies
Films about classical music and musicians
Films scored by Carl Stalling
Films directed by Bob Clampett
Films produced by Leon Schlesinger